Aphanopora is a genus of echinoderms belonging to the family Neolampadidae.

Species:

Aphanopora bassoris 
Aphanopora echinobrissoides

References

Cassiduloida
Echinoidea genera